Penthouse is a 1933 American Pre-Code crime film starring Warner Baxter as a lawyer and Myrna Loy as a call girl who helps him with a murder case. The film features Charles Butterworth as the butler, Mae Clarke as the murder victim, Phillips Holmes as the suspected murderer, and C. Henry Gordon as the gangster who arranged the murder. It was directed by W. S. Van Dyke and written by Frances Goodrich and Albert Hackett, based on a novel by Arthur Somers Roche. The film was later remade as the more sanitized Society Lawyer (1939), without the risqué pre-Code dialogue.

Plot
Attorney Jack Durant (Warner Baxter) successfully defends racketeer Tony Gaziotti (Nat Pendleton) against a high-profile murder charge and waives his fee. His staid law firm feels his taking the racketeer on as a client reflects badly on them; when he refuses to give up his exciting new line of work, they go their separate ways. His upper class girlfriend Sue Leonard (Martha Sleeper) turns down his proposal and breaks up with him for the same reason. Shortly afterward, Sue agrees to marry Tom Siddall (Phillips Holmes), but only if he gives up his mistress, Mimi Montagne (Mae Clarke). Although Tom offers Mimi a generous settlement, she becomes furious.

Mimi quickly returns to her former lover, gangster Jim Crelliman (C. Henry Gordon). He has her get Tom to meet her at a raucous party. After they go out on the balcony to talk, a shot is heard; the revelers find Mimi dead, and Tom with a revolver in his hand. A pawnbroker named Levitoff tells the police that he sold Tom the gun the same day. Sue begs Jack to defend Tom. He agrees, even though he gets an anonymous phone call telling him to stay out of it.

Jack asks Tony to find out what he can. Tony introduces him to Gertie Waxted (Myrna Loy), who was Mimi's friend and at the party. She tells him that she arrived after the murder, but he thinks she still may know something useful, so he invites her to spend the night in his suite. To her great surprise, however, he sleeps on the couch.

The next morning, Sue asks Jack to drop the case because she has received a call threatening his life. When Gertie appears in Jack's robe, Sue hastily departs, even though Gertie tells her that Jack is still in love with her.

Jack questions the pawnbroker without success. After he leaves, Levitoff is murdered. Jack goes to Gertie's apartment (directly across from the murder scene) to get some clothes for her. Crelliman shows up and offers him $200,000 to take a long vacation. When Jack turns him down, Crelliman threatens him. Jack leaves and breaks into the apartment directly above Gertie's, which he has learned belongs to Murtoch (George E. Stone), one of Crelliman's gunmen. From the entry and exit wounds on Mimi's body, he is sure the murderer was situated higher up; the angle from Murtoch's window is about right. A helpful elevator operator warns Jim that Crelliman's men are waiting for him in the lobby and leads him to the service elevator.

Jack sees Gertie in a club with Murtoch and jumps to conclusions. When she returns to Jack's apartment, he is mad until she tells him that she had to get Murtoch out of his apartment so Jack would not run into him when he broke in. He apologizes and admits he has fallen in love with her. He asks Gertie to marry him, but they are interrupted by a phone call from Tony, who has found out that Crelliman has decided to have Murtoch killed. Jack takes along Police Lieutenant "Steve" Stevens (Robert Emmett O'Connor) and several of his men to trick Murtoch into confessing. Gertie volunteers to lure Crelliman out onto the roof of the other building. After capturing Murtoch, Jack tells him that they will frame him for Crelliman's impending murder. Murtoch eventually cracks and confesses.

Meanwhile, Gertie tells Crelliman that she frightened Jack into accepting his offer, but he does not believe her and tells his men to take her "for a ride". Jack and the police hear gunfire. When they rush over, they find Crelliman and his henchmen all dead. Gertie and Tony are in the next room. Tony saved Gertie, but he himself collapses and dies from a gunshot wound.

Later, Gertie is packing to leave, thinking that Jack is getting back together with Sue. He tells Gertie that he wants to marry her and take her to Europe. When she reminds him she is no lady, he tells her she will do until one comes along.

Cast

 Warner Baxter as Jackson "Jack" Durant
 Myrna Loy as Gertie Waxted
 Charles Butterworth as Layton
 Mae Clarke as Mimi Montagne
 Phillips Holmes as Tom Siddall
 C. Henry Gordon as Jim Crelliman
 Martha Sleeper as Sue Leonard
 Nat Pendleton as Tony Gaziotti

 George E. Stone as Tim Murtoch
 Robert Emmett O'Connor as Police Lieutenant "Steve" Stevens
 Raymond Hatton as Angel (short bodyguard)
 Arthur Belasco as Tall bodyguard
 Samuel S. Hinds as Law firm partner
 Theresa Harris as Lily
 Tom Kennedy as Joe

Production
The working title of Penthouse was "Penthouse Legend."  Baxter was borrowed from Warner Bros. for the film.  The film was the first pairing of Loy and director W. S. Van Dyke, who would later direct many of the Thin Man films which would make Loy a star.  Penthouse screenwriters Frances Goodrich and Albert Hackett went on to write the screenplays for three of the six Thin Man films: The Thin Man (1934), After the Thin Man (1936), and Another Thin Man (1939).

After directing Penthouse, Van Dyke told MGM production boss Louis B. Mayer that Loy would be a big star if she continued to receive the right kinds of roles.

References

External links
 
 
 
 

1933 films
1933 crime films
American black-and-white films
American crime films
Films based on American novels
Films directed by W. S. Van Dyke
Films set in New York City
Metro-Goldwyn-Mayer films
1930s English-language films
1930s American films